Robert Milton Leach (April 2, 1879 – February 18, 1952) was a United States representative from Massachusetts. He was born in Franklin, New Hampshire, on April 2, 1879. He attended the public schools, Phillips Academy and Dartmouth College. He moved to Taunton, Massachusetts, in 1900 and engaged in the chain-store furniture business in New England.

He was commissioned as captain in the Ordnance Division of the United States Army during World War I. He was elected as a Republican to the Sixty-eighth Congress to fill the vacancy caused by the death of William S. Greene and served from November 4, 1924, to March 3, 1925. He was not a candidate for renomination. He resumed his former business activities and died in Eustis, Florida, on February 18, 1952. His interment was in Franklin Cemetery in Franklin, N.H.

External links
 

Dartmouth College alumni
1879 births
1952 deaths
Republican Party members of the United States House of Representatives from Massachusetts
People from Franklin, New Hampshire
People from Taunton, Massachusetts